Statistics of the Turkish First Football League for the 1973–74 season.

Overview
It was contested by 16 teams, and Fenerbahçe S.K. won the championship.

League table

Results

References
Turkey - List of final tables (RSSSF)

Süper Lig seasons
1973–74 in Turkish football
Turkey